Aladağ is a Turkish place name that means "variegated mountain" and may refer to:

Mountain ranges 
 Aladaglar, a mountain range in Turkey
 Anti-Taurus Mountains, also known as Aladağlar, mountains in the Central Taurus mountain chain of the Taurus Mountains in Turkey
 Aladagh Mountains in Iran

Places 
 Aladağ, Adana, a district center of Adana Province, Turkey
 Aladağ mine, a chromium ore mine
 Aladağ, Ezine
 Aladağ, Mersin, a village in Toroslar District of Mersin Province, Turkey
 Aladağ, Tarsus, a village in Tarsus district of Mersin Province, Turkey
 Aladagh Rural District, Iran
 Aladağlar National Park, a national park stretching over the provinces of Kayseri, Niğde and Adana in Turkey

People with the surname
Emin Aladağ (born 1983), Turkish footballer
Feo Aladag (born 1972), Austrian film director, screenwriter, producer, and actress
Merve Aladağ (born 1993), Turkish footballer
Züli Aladağ (born 1968), German-Kurdish film director, film producer, and screenwriter
Nevin Aladağ (born 1972), Turkish artist (documenta 14)

See also 
 Alatau (disambiguation)
 Alatau
 Aladagh Mountains

Turkish-language surnames
Turkish toponyms